Ludwig van Beethoven composed the Mass in C major, Op. 86, to a commission from Prince Nikolaus Esterházy II in 1807. The mass, scored for four vocal soloists, choir and orchestra, was premiered that year by the Prince's musical forces in Eisenstadt. Beethoven performed parts of it in his 1808 concert featuring the premieres of four major works including his Fifth Symphony. The mass was published in 1812 by Breitkopf & Härtel.

Both the Prince and contemporary critic E. T. A. Hoffmann were generally displeased by the work, though the latter still considered it "entirely worthy of the great master [because of its] inner structure [and] intelligent orchestration". The work has since been overshadowed by the later and better known Missa solemnis, though critics such as Michael Moore have noted the Mass in C major's superiority in "directness and an emotional content".

History and composition 

Beethoven had studied counterpoint in Vienna with Johann Georg Albrechtsberger, an authority in the field, but had not turned to sacred music until late in his career. He received a commission from Prince Nikolaus Esterházy II in 1807, extending a tradition established by Joseph Haydn, who for decades had served as the family's Kapellmeister (music director). Following his return from England in 1795, Haydn had composed one mass per year for the Esterházy family, to celebrate the name day of the Prince's wife. Haydn had ceased this tradition with the failure of his health in 1802. Beethoven was fully aware of the tradition that Haydn had established and it influenced him strongly in writing the Mass in C major. Beethoven confessed in a letter to the prince: "may I just say that I will hand the mass over to you with great trepidation, as Your Serene Highness is accustomed to having the inimitable masterworks of the great Haydn performed." The musicologist Lewis Lockwood wrote:

Premiere and performance 
Beethoven's mass was premiered on 13 September 1807 by the Prince's own musical forces in Eisenstadt, the ancestral seat of the Esterházys not far from Vienna. It is not known what building housed the performance, but the two likely candidates are the Bergkirche, which had hosted a number of the Haydn premieres, and the chapel of the Prince's principal residence, Schloss Esterházy.

The first performance was underrehearsed; the musicologist Stoltzfus described the dress rehearsal as "unsatisfactory", noting that only one of the five altos in the chorus was present. The premiere was not well received, particularly by the man who commissioned it, Prince Esterházy. Lockwood narrated the episode, reporting an anecdote 

Charles Rosen called the episode Beethoven's "most humiliating public failure". The prince had perhaps muted his reactions in directly addressing Beethoven, as in a later letter to the Countess Henriette von Zielinska he went so far as to say, "Beethoven's mass is unbearably ridiculous and detestable, and I am not convinced that it can ever be performed properly. I am angry and mortified."

Beethoven conducted parts of the mass, the Gloria and the Sanctus, in a concert on 22 December 1808, which featured the public premieres of his Symphony No. 5, Symphony No. 6, Piano Concerto No. 4 and Choral Fantasy.

Publication 

Beethoven offered the mass, after revising the composition, to the publisher Breitkopf & Härtel, together with the Fifth and Sixth Symphonies. Originally, the mass had been dedicated to Prince Esterházy; this dedication appears on the manuscript score used at the premiere. Perhaps unsurprisingly, given the outcome of the first performance and the Prince's reaction, Beethoven dedicated the published version (1812) to another person, Prince Kinsky. The first publication consisted of a printed score with handwritten copies of orchestral parts on request.

The publisher sent Beethoven an alternative German text by Christian Schreiber, about which Beethoven commented on 16 January 1811: "The translation of the Gloria seems to fit well to me, but to the Kyrie not so well, although the beginning “tief im Staub anbeten wir” [deep in dust we worship] fits very well; yet it seems to me in some expressions such as “ew’gen Weltenherrscher” [eternal ruler of the world] “Allgewaltigen” [omnipotent] are more suitable for the Gloria. The general character [...] in the Kyrie is heartfelt resignation, from where the depth of religious feelings “Gott erbarme dich unser” [God have mercy upon us] without, however, being sad, gentleness is the basis of the whole work, [...] although “eleison have mercy upon us” – yet there is cheerfulness in the whole. The Catholic goes to his church on Sundays bedecked with festive cheerfulness. The Kyrie Eleison is likewise the introduction to the whole mass; with such strong expressions little remains over for the places where they should really be strong."

Structure and scoring 

The composition is scored for four soloists (soprano, alto, tenor, bass), a four-part choir (SATB), and a symphony orchestra of flutes, oboes, clarinets, bassoons, horns, trumpets, timpani, strings and organ. The setting of the Latin Order of Mass is structured in five movements. In the following table of the movements, the voices, markings, keys and time signatures are taken from the score.

Reception 
E. T. A. Hoffmann wrote in a review in 1813, expecting the power of Beethoven's Fifth Symphony, about the "expression of a childlike serene mind, which, relying on its purity, trusts in belief in God's mercy and pleads to him as to a father who wants the best for his children and fulfills their requests ("den Ausdruck eines kindlich heiteren Gemüths, das, auf seine Reinheit bauend, gläubig der Gnade Gottes vertraut und zu ihm fleht wie zu dem Vater, der das Beste seiner Kinder will und ihre Bitten erhört)". In the C minor Agnus Dei he heard "a feeling of inner hurt which does not tear the heart but is good for it, and dissolves, like a sorrow from another world, to unearthly delight" ("ein Gefühl der inneren Wehmut, die aber das Herz nicht zerreisst, sondern ihm wohlthut, und sich, wie der Schmerz, der aus einer andern Welt gekommen ist, in überirdische Wonne auflöst"). Critic Nicholas Marston characterizes this review as "fail[ing] to find much favour".

Today, the mass is appreciated by critics (such as Rosen) but is probably one of the least performed of Beethoven's larger works. The work is generally overshadowed by Beethoven's later Missa solemnis. The Penguin Guide to Compact Discs (2007 edition) calls the work a "long-underrated masterpiece," while Michael Moore wrote "it has a directness and an emotional content that the [Missa solemnis] sometimes lacks."

Recordings
The C Major Mass was described by conductor Trevor Harvey as "unjustly neglected", in regards to its recording history. As of 2008 there were only around 10 recordings of the Mass in C major; the Missa solemnis had been recorded at least 21 times. Of these, two are recordings of both masses together: Carlo Maria Giulini with the Philharmonia Orchestra and Philharmonia Chorus (1971) as well as Colin Davis with the London Symphony Orchestra and London Symphony Chorus (2008). The Gramophone considers the former a stronger recording, due to its energy and vitality. Other noted recordings include a thoughtful interpretation by Richard Hickox and Collegium Musicum 90 (2003); a refreshing recording by John Eliot Gardiner with the Orchestre Révolutionnaire et Romantique and Monteverdi Choir; as well as an intimate take by George Guest with the Academy of St Martin in the Fields and Choir of St John's College, Cambridge.

Notes

References

Cited sources

External links 
 
 Free scores of this work in the Choral Public Domain Library (ChoralWiki) (arrangement for piano and voice)
 Ludwig van Beethoven: The Masses from Carus Carus-Verlag 12 June 2015
 John Palmer: Mass for soloists, chorus & orchestra in C major, Op. 86 AllMusic
 Mass in C, opus 86 lvbeethoven.com
 Ludwig van Beethoven / Choral Fantasy and Mass in C Major San Francisco Choral Society
 Mass in C-major (MIDI), with practice files (MP3) for choristers

Compositions by Ludwig van Beethoven
Beethoven
1807 compositions
Compositions in C major